Nieuwebrug  is a village in Heerenveen in the province of Friesland, the Netherlands. It had a population of around 215 in 2017.

History
The village was first mentioned in 1846 as Nieuwebrug, and translates to "new bridge" which refers to a bridge on the Leeuwarden-Heerenveen road. In 1840, it was home to 197 people.

Before 2014, Nieuwebrug was part of the Skarsterlân municipality and before 1984 it was earlier part of Heerenveen.

References

External links

Populated places in Friesland